Sohrab Ahmari (born February 1, 1985) is an Iranian American columnist, editor, and author of nonfiction books. He is a founding editor of the online magazine Compact. He is a contributing editor of The Catholic Herald, and a columnist for First Things. Previously, he served as the op-ed editor of the New York Post, a columnist and editor with The Wall Street Journal opinion pages in New York and London, and as a senior writer at Commentary. 

Ahmari is the author of The New Philistines (2016), a critique of how identity politics are corrupting the arts; From Fire, by Water (2019), a spiritual memoir about his conversion to Catholicism; and The Unbroken Thread: Discovering the Wisdom of Tradition in an Age of Chaos (2021).

Early life and education
Ahmari was born in Tehran, Iran. In his 2012 book, Arab Spring Dreams, he writes that he was interrogated by security officials about his parents and faced disciplinary action as a child for accidentally bringing a videocassette of Star Wars into school at a time when Western films were officially banned in the country. In 1998, at the age of 13, Ahmari moved with his family to the United States.

Ahmari earned a J.D. degree from Northeastern University School of Law in Boston. Between college and law school, Ahmari completed a two-year commitment to Teach for America in the Rio Grande Valley region of South Texas.

While in law school, inspired in part by the protests following the disputed June 2009 Iranian presidential election, he began working as a freelance journalist, contributing pieces to publications such as The Boston Globe, The Wall Street Journal, The New Republic, The Chronicle of Higher Education, and Commentary among others.

Career
After serving as a Robert L. Bartley fellow at The Wall Street Journal in 2012, Ahmari joined the publication as assistant books editor. He then served as an editorial page writer based in London, where he wrote editorials and commissions and edited op-eds for the Journal's European edition.

In these positions, Ahmari wrote book reviews, op-eds, and conducted interviews with prominent politicians, activists, and intellectuals for The Journal's "Weekend Interview" feature.

Dispute with David French
A high-profile dispute between Ahmari and National Review writer David French broke out over the summer of 2019 as a result of the publication of Ahmari's polemic "Against David French-ism", sparking numerous essays and commentaries in politically conservative publications like National Review and The American Conservative, as well as in moderate and progressive outlets like The New York Times, The New Yorker, and The Atlantic.

The dispute began on May 26, 2019, when Ahmari expressed on Twitter his frustration with a Facebook advertisement for a children's drag queen reading hour at a library in Sacramento, California, which he described as "transvestic fetishism". In the tweet, Ahmari argued that there is no "polite, David French-ian third way around the cultural civil war". This prompted a response from French in a May 28 essay in National Review entitled "Decency Is No Barrier to Justice or the Common Good". The dispute escalated significantly after Ahmari published the essay "Against David French-ism" in the conservative religious journal First Things on May 29, 2019.  In the essay, Ahmari argued that French was insufficiently socially conservative, and that his belief in individual autonomy was contributing to the overall degradation of American society. The direct targeting of French and the impromptu creation of the "David French-ism" political philosophy led the essay to gain significant notoriety, prompting a response from French and the publication of numerous commentaries. On September 5, 2019, French and Ahmari engaged in an in-person political debate moderated by New York Times columnist Ross Douthat at the Catholic University of America in Washington D.C., again prompting a flurry of commentaries.

The dispute centered on their differing opinions on how conservatives should approach cultural and political debate, with Ahmari deriding what he calls "David French-ism", a political persuasion he defines as believing "that the institutions of a technocratic market society are neutral zones that should, in theory, accommodate both traditional Christianity and the libertine ways and paganized ideology of the other side".  He argues that this belief leads to an ineffective conservative movement, and contends that the best way for culturally conservative values to prevail in society is a strategy of "discrediting...opponents and weakening or destroying their institutions", which he maintains is a tactic already utilized by progressives, leaving conservatives who adhere to the David French-style of politics impotent in what he views as a raging culture war in the United States. He argues that the political realm should be viewed as one of "war and enmity", and that the power of the government should be directly utilized to impose culturally conservative values on society. French, by contrast, advocates a conservative libertarian approach in which decency, civility, and respect for individual rights are emphasized, and argues that Ahmari's beliefs "forsake" the philosophy of classical liberalism that the Founding Fathers of the United States espoused. He placed particular criticism on Ahmari's desire for direct government intervention in the lives of individuals, which he argues is not only antithetical to liberty but is a politically ruinous tactic for conservatives, who would end up on the receiving end of progressive policies if the government were given greater license to interfere in the private lives of individuals.

Books
While in law school, Ahmari co-edited with Nasser Weddady the 2012 book Arab Spring Dreams: The Next Generation Speaks Out for Freedom and Justice from North Africa to Iran, an anthology of the top essays submitted by young Middle Eastern dissidents to the Dream Deferred Essay Contest. The Times Literary Supplement writes that Weddady and Ahmari "perceptively edited this collection of winning entries" from the Dream Deferred contest, and that "some of these young writers [featured in the anthology] possess more clarity than all the pundits combined." The book received endorsements from Polish Nobel Peace Prize winner Lech Wałęsa and feminist icon Gloria Steinem, who wrote the anthology's foreword.

Ahmari's book, The New Philistines, a critique of how identity politics are corrupting the arts, was released on October 20, 2016 from Biteback Publishing. In January 2019, Ignatius Press published his spiritual memoir, From Fire, by Water, about his conversion to Roman Catholicism.

His most recent book is entitled; The Unbroken Thread: Discovering the Wisdom of Tradition in an Age of Chaos (2021).

Personal life
Ahmari was raised as a Twelver Shia but later embraced atheism, ultimately later converting to Catholicism in 2016. In late September 2016, he wrote a three-page article about his conversion in The Catholic Herald, which was the cover story of the September 30, 2016 issue.

Bibliography
 (2021) The Unbroken Thread: Discovering the Wisdom of Tradition in an Age of Chaos. Convergent Books.
 (2019) From Fire, by Water: My Journey to the Catholic Faith. Ignatius Press. .
 (2016) The New Philistines. Biteback Publishing. .
 (2012) Arab Spring Dreams: The Next Generation Speaks Out for Freedom and Justice from North Africa to Iran (co-edited with Nasser Weddady). Palgrave Macmillan. .

References

External links
 
 Against David French-ism, by Sohrab Ahmari at First Things
 

Living people
1985 births
Mass media people from Tehran
Iranian emigrants to the United States
Northeastern University School of Law alumni
The Wall Street Journal people
Converts to Roman Catholicism from atheism or agnosticism
American male journalists
Teach For America alumni
Educators from New York City
New York Post people
Iranian Roman Catholics
21st-century Iranian writers
American former Shia Muslims
Iranian former Shia Muslims